Cambridge Township is a civil township of Lenawee County in the U.S. state of Michigan. The population was 5,299 at the 2000 census.

Communities 
 The village of Onsted is in the southern part of the township. 
A post office operated from January 21, 1835, until August 31, 1905.

Geography 

Demographics 

As of the census  of 2000, there were 5,299 people, 1,996 households, and 1,566 families in the township. The racial makeup of the township was 97.30% White, 0.15% African American, 0.36% Native American, 0.26% Asian, 0.66% from other races, and 1.26% from two or more races. Hispanic or Latino of any race were 2.02% of the population.

Of the 1,996 households, 33.9% had children under the age of 18 living with them, 68.8% were married couples living together, 6.4% had a female householder with no husband present, and 21.5% were non-families. 17.8% of households were one person, and 6.9% were one person aged 65 or older.  The average household size was 2.65 and the average family size was 3.01.

In the township the population was spread out, with 25.8% under the age of 18, 6.1% from 18 to 24, 27.8% from 25 to 44, 29.1% from 45 to 64, and 11.3% 65 or older.  The median age was 40 years.  For every 100 females, there were 99.4 males.  For every 100 females age 18 and over, there were 97.5 males.

The median household income was $59,450 and the median family income  was $70,246. Males had a median income of $52,005 versus $26,605 for females. The per capita income for the township was $26,705.  About 2.5% of families and 3.4% of the population were below the poverty line, including 3.3% of those under age 18 and 2.5% of those age 65 or over.

Notable person
Lyster Hoxie Dewey, botanist.

References

External links
Lenawee County government site
Complete text of History of Lenawee County published in 1909 by the Western Historical Society
Information on Townships in the State of Michigan

Townships in Lenawee County, Michigan
Townships in Michigan
1835 establishments in Michigan Territory
Populated places established in 1835